The Philippines Lacrosse Association (PLA), also known as Philippines Lacrosse, is the governing body of lacrosse in the Philippines and is an associate member of World Lacrosse. The PLA was established in September 2012. It organizes the country's men's national team.

Lacrosse was officially introduced in the Philippines in September 2013, when the PLA outreach director Justin Manjares and President Ron Garcia met with Philippine Olympic Committee (POC) and the Philippine Sports Commission (PSA) regarding the lacrosse body's agenda and talked about promoting the sport with the guidance of the POC and PSC.

The Philippines Lacrosse Association became the 50th member of World Lacrosse as voted on February 17, 2014 when the international organization was still known as the Federation of International Lacrosse. It was given full World Lacrosse membership in 2021.

It joined the Asia-Pacific Lacrosse Union in 2019 as an associate member.

External links
 
 Philippines Lacrosse Association on Facebook

References

Sports governing bodies in the Philippines
Philippines
2012 establishments in the Philippines
Lacrosse in the Philippines
Sports organizations established in 2012